Obesotoma robusta is a species of sea snail, a marine gastropod mollusk in the family Mangeliidae.

Description
The length of the shell varies between 8 mm and 16 mm.

Distribution
This species occurs in the Sea of Japan, Sakhalin and off Northwest Canada.

References

 Packard, A.S. (1867) Observations on the glacial phenomena of Labrador and Maine, with a view of the Recent invertebrate fauna of Labrador. Memoirs of the Boston Society of Natural History, new series, 1 (2) : 210–303.
 Hasegawa, K., Okutani, T. and E. Tsuchida (2000) Family Turridae. In: Okutani, T. (ed.), Marine Mollusks in Japan. Tokai University Press, Tokyo, 619-667 (in Japanese).

External links
  Tucker, J.K. 2004 Catalog of recent and fossil turrids (Mollusca: Gastropoda). Zootaxa 682:1-1295.

robusta
Gastropods described in 1866